Rev. John Frederick Augustus Sykes Fayette (c. 1810 – February 27, 1876) was an American and Canadian college-educated Presbyterian minister.  Fayette attended Western Reserve College, present day Case Western Reserve University, beginning in 1832 and graduating in 1836, notably as Ohio's first African American college student.

Early life and education

Fayette arrived in Hudson, Ohio, via New York City, when his minister, Rev. Samuel Hanson Cox of Laight Street Presbyterian Church wrote a letter of recommendation to President Charles Backus Storrs of Western Reserve College. In 1832, Fayette because the first African American to enroll at a university in Ohio and west of the Appalachian Mountains.  In 1836, John Sykes Fayette because the first African American to graduate from a university in Ohio and west of the Appalachian Mountains.  Staying for another year, Fayette earned a graduate degree in divinity graduating again in 1837.  

As a participating Abolitionist, Fayette spent time associating with local Hudson resident John Brown.

Presbyterian ministries

Often described as an "educated mulatto," Fayette moved to Canada in 1839 after being licensed by the Cleveland Presbytery, in 1840 founded the "Wellington  Institute" in the Waterloo region of Berlin, Ontario (known today as Kitchener, Ontario),  teaching local and Mennonite children for two years. The institute did not attract enough students to make ends meet, and closed after two years. 

Fayette was finally licensed in Canada by the Presbytery of Niagara, a minister for several Presbyterian congregations, first in Ancaster in 1844 and then at Barton Stone Church from 1845 to 1850.  The church, which still stands in Hamilton, Ontario, was completed in 1847.  Other cities Fayette served as minister included St. Vincent, Tecumseh, and Watford.

Fayette died on February 27, 1876, in London, Ontario, and is buried in Oakland Cemetery next to his third wife Elizabeth Bartlett Forbes.

References

External links
 First Documented African American Alumnus

1876 deaths
Case Western Reserve University alumni
People from London, Ontario
African-American abolitionists
Canadian abolitionists
Canadian Presbyterian ministers
19th-century Presbyterian ministers